Edinburgh College of Art (ECA) is one of eleven schools in the College of Arts, Humanities and Social Sciences at the University of Edinburgh. Tracing its history back to 1760, it provides higher education in art and design, architecture, history of art, and music disciplines for over three thousand students and is at the forefront of research and research-led teaching in the creative arts, humanities, and creative technologies. ECA comprises five subject areas: School of Art, Reid School of Music, School of Design, School of History of Art, and Edinburgh School of Architecture & Landscape Architecture (ESALA). ECA is mainly located in the Old Town of Edinburgh, overlooking the Grassmarket; the Lauriston Place campus is located in the University of Edinburgh's Central Area Campus, not far from George Square.

The college was founded in 1760, and gained its present name and site in 1907. Formerly associated with Heriot-Watt University, its degrees have been issued by the University of Edinburgh since 2004. The college formally merged with the university on 1 August 2011, combining with the School of Arts, Culture and Environment and continues to exist with the name Edinburgh College of Art as an enlarged school in the College of Arts, Humanities and Social Sciences.

History
Edinburgh College of Art (ECA) can trace its history back to 1760, when the Trustees Drawing Academy of Edinburgh was established by the Board of Trustees for Fisheries, Manufactures and Improvements in Scotland. This board had been set up by Act of Parliament in 1727 to "encourage and promote the fisheries or such other manufactures and improvements in Scotland as may most conduce to the general good of the United Kingdom". The aim of the academy was to train designers for the manufacturing industries. Drawing and the design of patterns for the textile industries were taught at the Academy's rooms at Picardy Place.

The board was responsible for the construction of the Royal Institution (named for the Royal Institution for the Encouragement of the Fine Arts in Scotland), now the Royal Scottish Academy building, on The Mound and also commissioned the Scottish National Portrait Gallery on Queen Street. From 1826, classes were held at the Royal Institution building. The master of the school was always a fine artist, the first being French painter William Delacour. Subsequent masters included Alexander Runciman and David Allan. The academy's focus gradually shifted from applied arts to encompass fine art, and the school gained a reputation for excellence in both painting and design. Scottish artists who were trained at the Academy include John Brown, Alexander Nasmyth and Andrew Wilson.

In 1858, the academy was affiliated to the Science and Art Department in London, known as the "South Kensington system", under which it became the Government School of Art for the city of Edinburgh. A School of Applied Art was also established under this system. The Drawing School became part of a system of schools managed on similar lines, and distinctive teaching practices were lost. In 1903 it amalgamated with the School of Applied Art. In 1907, the Scottish Education Department took over responsibility for the school, and it became Edinburgh College of Art.

ECA was officially recognised by the Scottish Government as a Small Specialist Institution for the teaching of art, design and architecture prior to the merger with University of Edinburgh in 2011. From 1968 it was associated with Heriot-Watt University for degree awarding purposes but the validation agreement with Heriot-Watt University was due to end in 2012.  In 2004 ECA partnered with the University of Edinburgh for degree awarding purposes, an Academic Federation Agreement to facilitate closer collaboration was put in place between the two institutions in 2007 and they merged in 2011.  At the time the merger plan was announced in January 2011, Scottish Government Education Secretary Mike Russell criticised the financial management of ECA.

The joint Edinburgh School of Architecture and Landscape Architecture (ESALA) formed in August 2009 as a joint venture between ECA and the University of Edinburgh.

The first professorship in an ECA subject area was the Reid Professor of Music, which was created in 1839, with the first holder being Scottish composer John Thomson who conducted the first Reid concert in 1841.  The Watson Gordon Chair of Fine Art founded some forty years later, the first of its kind in the British Isles and a turning point in the teaching of the History of Art.

In 2005, the College joined with Edinburgh Napier University to launch the Screen Academy Scotland, a new centre of excellence in film learning and education.

College buildings

With the creation of Edinburgh College of Art in 1907, the institution moved to new premises on Lady Lawson Street. Formerly a cattle market, the site lies above the Grassmarket and opposite Edinburgh Castle. The red sandstone main building was designed in the Beaux-Arts style by John Wilson while working for John More Dick Peddie and George Washington Browne, and was completed in 1909. The main building was listed Category A in 1970. Inside, the Sculpture Court displays casts of the Elgin Marbles and other antique statuary, alongside changing displays of contemporary student's work.

The Architecture Building was added to the east end of the college in 1961, designed by architect Ralph Cowan, who was a Professor of Architecture at the college. In 1977 the Lauriston Campus was expanded with the addition of the Hunter Building. This L-shaped red sandstone block, designed by Anthony Wheeler in 1971, encloses the college courtyard and fronts Lauriston Place to the south. In the 1990s the college took over a separate group of buildings in the Grassmarket, for use as a library and teaching space, and also took over the former Salvation Army building on West Port. These buildings in the Grassmarket and West Port were disposed of after the College purchased Evolution House.

The nine-storey Evolution House on West Port by Reiach and Hall Architects was completed 2003, adjacent to the main College building. Built as speculative offices, it now houses the art and design library, as well as providing design studios and office facilities for the School of Design. While the college remains mainly concentrated on the Lauriston Place Campus, as a result of the merger with the University of Edinburgh in August 2011, the new enlarged ECA incorporated Minto House on Chambers Street (part of ESALA) and Alison House in Nicolson Square (Reid School of Music). In 2017, the Lauriston Campus expanded to include the former Lothian & Borders Fire & Rescue Service Headquarters, formerly housing the'Museum of Fire', Building (arch. Robert Morham, 1897-1901).

The Wee Red Bar serves as the student union bar, and acts as a year-round venue for gigs and theatre shows, and also acts a venue during the Edinburgh Festival Fringe

Notable alumni and academics
See also :Category:Alumni of the Edinburgh College of Art

Architects
 Rab and Denise Bennetts, founders of Bennetts Associates
 David J. Burney, commissioner at the New York City Department of City Planning
 Alan Balfour, former dean of the Georgia Tech College of Architecture
 Theodore S. Clerk, (1909–1965), city planner, first Ghanaian architect and developer of the port city of Tema
 Sir Nicholas Grimshaw (born 1939), architect of the Eden Project, president of the Royal Academy since 2004
 Sir William Kininmonth (1904–1988), architect of Adam House and Pollock Halls, both in Edinburgh
 John McAslan, architect
 Sir Robert Matthew (1906–1975), designed the Royal Commonwealth Pool and founded RMJM
 Sir James Dunbar-Nasmith (born 1927), conservation architect and head of ECA's Department of Architecture 1978–1988
 Patrick Nuttgens (1930–2004), academic and writer on architecture
 B. Marcus Priteca (1889–1971), theatre architect
 Sir Basil Spence (1907–1976), architect of Coventry Cathedral and the New Zealand Parliament Building (nicknamed 'The Beehive') in Wellington, New Zealand

Artists
 Sarah Gough Adamson, landscape painter
 Sam Ainsley, artist
 Barbara Balmer, painter
 Violet Banks, painter
 Wilhelmina Barns-Graham, artist
 Mardi Barrie, artist
 Dame Elizabeth Blackadder, artist
 John Blair, artist
 Elizabeth York Brunton, painter and printmaker
 Hugh Buchanan, artist
 Alexander Beauchamp Cameron, painter
 Paul Carter, artist
 John Kingsley Cook, artist and College lecturer
 Stanley Cursiter, artist
 Alan Davie, artist
 Mabel Dawson, painter
 Isobelle Ann Dods-Withers, painter
 Yvonne Drewry, painter and printmaker
 Jean Duncan, painter and printmaker
 Moyna Flannigan, painter and printmaker
 William Geissler, artist
 William George Gillies, artist
 Tom Gourdie, artist
 Sir James Gunn, artist
 Charles Martin Hardie, artist
 William Hole, artist
 Gwyneth Leech, artist
 Tessa Lynch, artist
 William McLaren, artist
 Wendy McMurdo, artist
 Caroline McNairn, artist
 David Michie, artist
 John Maxwell, artist
 Robert Montgomery, artist and poet
 Katie Paterson, artist and Honorary Fellow of the University of Edinburgh (2013)
 Sir Robin Philipson, artist
 John Platt, artist
 Nina Pope and Karen Guthrie, aka Somewhere
 Barbara Rae, painter and printmaker
 Anne Redpath, artist
 Patrick Reyntiens, artist
 Paul Rooney, artist
 Helen Stevenson, printmaker
 Alan Sutherland, artist
 Adam Bruce Thomson, artist
 Clare Twomey, artist
 Richard Wright, artist, winner of the 2009 Turner Prize

Painters
 John Bellany, painter
 William Crozier, painter
 Victorine Foot, painter
 William Gear, painter
 Alan Gourley – painter and stained glass artist
 Nicola Green, painter
 Callum Innes, painter and Turner Prize nominee
 Lady Caroline Kininmonth, painter
 David McClure, painter
 Alexander McNeish, painter
 Sir William MacTaggart, painter
 Emily Murray Paterson, painter
 Janet Pierce, painter
 Samuel Robin Spark, painter
 David Dougal Williams, painter

Sculptors
 Phyllis Bone, sculptor
 Mary Syme Boyd, sculptor
 Alexander Carrick, sculptor and academic
 Fanny Lam Christie, sculptor
 Christopher Hall, sculptor
 David Harding, sculptor
 Pilkington Jackson, sculptor of the Robert the Bruce statue at Bannockburn, and the college war memorial (1922)
 Donald Locke, sculptor
 Hew Lorimer, sculptor
 Elizabeth Ogilvie, sculptor
 James Pittendrigh MacGillivray, sculptor
 Sir Eduardo Paolozzi, sculptor and artist
 Scott Sutherland, sculptor

Musicians
 Louise Alder, Soprano
 Sandy Brown, Scottish jazz clarinettist
 Anna Clyne, Composer
 Django Django, band
 Al Fairweather, Scottish jazz trumpeter
 Futuristic Retro Champions, Scottish ElectroPop band
 John Maclean, member of The Beta Band and The Aliens.
 Sir James MacMillan, Composer and Conductor
 The Magnificents, Scottish rock band
 Jamie Muir, percussionist with Music Improvisation Company, King Crimson, Giles, Muir, Cunningham
 The Rezillos, 1970s new wave band, featuring Jo Callis who went on to The Human League
 Sir Donald Runnicles, Conductor 
 Rebecca Saunders, composer
 Roy Williamson, member of The Corries, and author of Flower of Scotland

Writers
 John Arden, playwright
 Alan Bold, poet
 Ruthven Todd, poet, novelist

Other
 Dorothy Angus, embroidery artist
 Harriet Braine, musical comedian and archivist
 Shashi Caan, interior architect/designer and president of The International Federation of Interior Architects/Designers
 Rose Ferraby, archaeologist and artist
 Holly Fulton, fashion designer
 Tom Gauld, cartoonist and illustrator
 Supriya Lele, fashion designer
 Katie Leung, stage and screen actress - obtained photography degree
 John Maclean, film director
 Ryan McHenry, film director
 Kerry Anne Mullaney, film director
 David Shaw Nicholls, designer & architect
 Sandy Paris, cricketer
 Aileen Paterson writer and illustrator of children's books
 Adam Robson, rugby player, former head of the Scottish Rugby Union
 Alexander White, footwear designer

See also
 List of further and higher education colleges in Scotland

References

 Notes on the Early History of the Royal Scottish Academy, George Harvey, (Edmonston & Douglas, 1873)
 Archives of Scottish Higher Education

Further reading 
 Scott Lawrie - The History of Edinburgh College of Art 1906-1969, MPhil Thesis, 1995. Copies held in ECA library and Heriot-Watt University Library.

External links

 Edinburgh College of Art home page

 
1760 establishments in Scotland
Art schools in Scotland
Architecture schools in Scotland
Buildings and structures completed in 1907
Category A listed buildings in Edinburgh
Educational institutions established in 1760
Listed educational buildings in Scotland
Art
Arts in Edinburgh
Contemporary art galleries in Scotland